Arnotts was a department store in Glasgow, Scotland. It became part of the House of Fraser and one of their group brands.

History

The store was opened by John Arnott as a subsidiary of Arnott, Cannock & Co of Dublin in 1850 in Jamaica Street as a drapery. During 1886 the partnership between Arnott and Cannock was dissolved and Thomas Arnott, half brother of John, ran the store under the name of Arnott & Co..

In 1864, the building was acquired from the trustees of the City of Glasgow Bank, expanding the store so by 1874 it was a department store. In 1891 the business was incorporated and by 1906 the store frontage was remodelled. During the 1920s and 30s the Company started to struggle and in 1936, Fraser, Sons & Co Ltd bought the business and created a new Arnott & Co company. Frasers modernised the store with the second and third floor being opened up to showroom space and adding of an elevator. In 1938, it was merged by Frasers with neighbour Robert Simpson & Co, who they had also purchased in 1936, to create Arnott Simpson Ltd. The two stores were reconstructed as one. In 1947, the Company Arnott-Simpsons was liquidated, along with Fraser, Sons & Co and the store became a trading name of the House of Fraser. 

Further department stores acquired by House of Fraser were re-branded as Arnott Simpson until the Arnotts trading name was adopted for the majority of the group's stores in Scotland, including the acquired T. Baird & Sons group, and two of the House of Fraser's seven Edinburgh stores (including Patrick Thomson). House of Fraser closed its last remaining Arnotts store, that in Paisley (formerly Robert Cochran & Sons purchased 1964), in January 2004.

References

Defunct retail companies of the United Kingdom
Defunct department stores of the United Kingdom
History of Glasgow
House of Fraser